Skowronek is a Polish-language surname, meaning literally lark. It may refer to:

Artur Skowronek, Polish football manager
Ben Skowronek (born 1997), American football player
Martin Skowroneck (1926–2014), German harpsichord builder
Michał Skowronek (born 1949), Polish runner
Ryszard Skowronek (born 1949), Polish decathlete
Stephen Skowronek (born 1951), American political scientist

Polish-language surnames